The J. K. Organisation is an Indian industrial conglomerate, with headquarters in Delhi, Kanpur and Mumbai. It is run by the Singhania family, which rose to prominence in Kanpur, India, under Lala Kamlapat Singhania. The name JK is derived from the initials of Kamlapat and his father Seth Juggilal (1857–1922), who belonged to the family associated with the Marwari firm Sevaram Ramrikhdas of Mirzapur. The JK Group was founded in 1918.

History
The group rose in importance in the 1950s to 1980s, when it was the third-largest industrial conglomerate in India after the Birla and Tata conglomerates. The group has multi-business, multi-product, and multi-location operations, with interests in many countries. It has overseas manufacturing operations in Mexico, Indonesia, Romania, Belgium, Portugal, the UAE, and Switzerland. The organization also includes research and development institutes in various fields. The family is currently divided into three main groups headed by Dr. Gaur Hari Singhania based in Kanpur, Shri Hari Shankar Singhania based in Delhi and Shri Vijaypat Singhania based in Mumbai. The three men are cousins who now run independent businesses, which are technically and legally separate entities and have no cross-holdings or common directors and employees, sharing only the family history.

The Kanpur family runs JK Cement Ltd and JK Technosoft, which provides technology solutions to organizations, while the Delhi family runs JK Tyre, JK Paper, JK Lakshmi Cement, JK Fenner India Ltd, Umang Dairies Ltd, JK Seeds, Global Strategic Technologies (a military solutions and equipment division), JK Risk Managers & Insurance Brokers and DELOPT-A Division of JKPL(design, development and production of Embedded Systems and Electro-optics Systems for Military and Civilian applications). The Mumbai family runs the Raymond Group of companies. Though run independently of each other, the various companies that are part of the organization all use the JK Group Logo, in recognition of the family's history. By tradition, the oldest male member of the family becomes the President of the JK Organisation and grants use of the logo to companies run by various family members when they apply for membership and pay an annual fee.

References

External links
 J. K. Organisation website
 J. K. Super Cement #LightOfHappiness Festive Campaign
 JK Cement Ltd and PRESPL sign a Strategic MoU 

Companies based in Delhi
Conglomerate companies of India
Tyre manufacturers of India
Conglomerate companies established in 1918
Indian brands
Indian companies established in 1918